The  is a full hybrid electric subcompact/supermini hatchback (B-segment) manufactured and marketed by Toyota since 2011. The nameplate is exclusive to the Japanese domestic market, as the vehicle was exported to overseas markets as the Prius c, leveraging the popularity of the Prius hybrid car nameplate and marketed as the smaller alternative to the Prius liftback.

The Aqua is considered the most successful nameplate launch in Japan in the last 20 years. , the Aqua/Prius c is the second highest-selling Toyota hybrid model after the regular Prius, with 1,380,100 units sold worldwide. Japan as Aqua's market leader has sold 1,154,500 units of the model through January 2017. The Aqua was the best-selling (non-kei) car in Japan for three years in a row, from 2013 to 2015.

The name Aqua means 'water' in Latin. The name was meant to associate the car with an "image of clean transparency" and "something that is universally cherished".

First generation (NHP10; 2011) 

The production version of the first-generation Aqua was unveiled at the 2011 Tokyo Motor Show. Its design was previously previewed by the Prius c concept car which was unveiled at the January 2011 North American International Auto Show. The first facelift was announced in December 2014, along with a crossover-inspired variant called the X-URBAN. A second facelift was introduced in June 2017, with the crossover-inspired variant redesigned and renamed as the Aqua Crossover.

Second generation (XP210; 2021) 

The second-generation Aqua was unveiled on 19 July 2021 and went on sale on the same day. Built on the GA-B platform shared with the XP210 series Yaris, the wheelbase has been extended by  compared to the previous generation. It retained the  width, allowing it to remain in the "compact car" category of Japanese government dimension regulations. It was initially offered in four grade levels: B, X, G and Z. The GR Sport grade was added later in late November 2022.

According to Toyota, the second-generation Aqua is the world's first vehicle to use a high-output bipolar nickel–hydrogen battery as its electric drive battery, offering twice the output of the standard nickel-metal hydride battery equipped to the outgoing Aqua. The battery also delivers improved accelerator responsiveness and enables linear and smooth acceleration from low speeds, according to the carmaker. The speed range at which the vehicle can operate solely on electrical power has also been increased. This battery is used on the X, G, Z and GR Sport grades, while the B grade used the lithium-ion unit.

Sales

References

External links 

 

Aqua
Cars introduced in 2011
2020s cars
Subcompact cars
Hatchbacks
Front-wheel-drive vehicles
All-wheel-drive vehicles
Hybrid electric cars
Partial zero-emissions vehicles
Vehicles with CVT transmission